Pierce Butler (6 May 1774 – 18 August 1846) was an Irish politician in the United Kingdom House of Commons.

Butler was the son of Edmund Butler, 11th Viscount Mountgarret and Lady Henrietta Butler. He married Anne March, daughter of Thomas March, in 1800. They had eleven children including:
 Charlotte Juliana Butler (1778 – 26 October 1830)
 Pierce Somerset Butler (1801–1865)
 Reverend Edmund John Butler (1804–1873)
 Henry Butler (1805–1881)
 Somerset Butler (1808–1850)
 Thomas Butler (1810–1848)
 William Butler (1814–1847)
 Walter Butler (1821–1900)

Pierce Butler was elected to the United Kingdom House of Commons as Member of Parliament for County Kilkenny in 1832, and held the seat until 1846. In the House he spoke against Tithe enforcement and against the continuation of the Act of Union.

He served as M.P. with his son. Butler gained the rank of Colonel in the service of the Kilkenny Militia. He died on 13 June 1846 at age 72.

References

External links 
 
 

    
    
    

1774 births
1846 deaths
Members of the Parliament of the United Kingdom for County Kilkenny constituencies (1801–1922)
UK MPs 1832–1835
UK MPs 1837–1841
UK MPs 1841–1847
Irish Repeal Association MPs
Younger sons of viscounts
British Militia officers